Edward Wike Sutton (March 16, 1935 – September 20, 2008) was an American professional football player who was a halfback and defensive back in the National Football League (NFL) for the Washington Redskins and the New York Giants.  He played college football at the University of North Carolina and was selected in the third round of the 1957 NFL Draft.

Even while playing professional football, Sutton began attending medical school, then after graduation from the University of Tennessee, he began a practice in Gardena, California.  He left the practice for two years when he was drafted into the U.S. Army Medical Corps, where he served two years in a M.A.S.H. unit in Vietnam.  Relocating in 1978, he started his long-time occupational medicine practice in Fresno, California, known as Valley Industrial and Family Medical Group.

In 1999 Dr. Sutton was inducted into the North Carolina Sports Hall of Fame.  For decades he was active in the NFL Alumni Association, and was a recipient of the NFL Alumni Career Achievement Award.  A few months prior to his death, he completed his autobiography entitled "Tales of the Comet: The Fast-Paced Life of Ed Sutton," in conjunction with Bob Terrell.

Sutton died September 20, 2008 at Sequoyah Cardiac Surgery Hospital in Redwood City, due to complications following heart bypass surgery.

References

1935 births
2008 deaths
American football halfbacks
New York Giants players
North Carolina Tar Heels football players
Washington Redskins players
People from Sylva, North Carolina
United States Army Medical Corps officers
United States Army personnel of the Vietnam War
American occupational health practitioners